Evan Yang (November 26, 1920 – March 29, 1978) was a Chinese film director, screenwriter, actor and songwriter from Hong Kong.

Early life 
On November 26, 1920, Yang was born in Wuhsien city, Jiangsu Province, China. Yang's father was Yang Qianli, a politician and university professor. His uncles and aunts include architect Yang Xiliu(S. J. Young), animator Cy Young, entrepreneur Yang Xiren and Yang Renlan (mother of sociologist Fei Xiaotong).

In 1925, Yang moved to Wu County, Jiangsu, his ancestral home. In 1937, he moved to Shanghai with his family.

In 1941, Yang graduated from St. John's University, Shanghai.

Career 
Yang met Hu Shih in Shanghai in. Hu Shih said 'Yang Yanqi is just 13 years old and likes reading literatures, have a inherited genius and must be uncommon ones.'

In 1936, Yang wrote his first script In The Era which was unaccepted.

Yang started writing film script in Hong Kong from 1948 and started using the name "Evan Yang" from 1951.

Yang was an editor in chief of Peace Daily Newspaper.

As a film director, Yang's early films were sombre and melancholic. Yang's first Hong Kong film as a film director was Notorious Woman, a 1953 Mandarin Drama. Yang became a film director for Cathay Studio. Yang directed more than 55 films. As a screenwriter, Yang also wrote more than 55 films.

Yang wrote lyrics from 1950s to early 1970s, and signed to EMI in 1967. He also wrote essays with other pen names.

Yang's film works include Air Hostess, The Story of a Fur Coat, Spring Song, Happily Ever After and Bachelors Beware, and lyrics works include The Second Spring, I'll Fly Into Sky, I Love Cha-cha, Spring Song.

Filmography

Films 
This is a partial list of films.
 1953 Notorious Woman (aka The Activities of Miss Soo Lee, The Secret Life of Lady So Lee) - Director.
 1955 Tokyo Interlude (aka Beauty of Tokyo) - Director.
 1955 Blood Will Tell - Director.
 1956 Blind Love (aka Always in My Heart) - Director.
 1956 Madame Butterfly (aka Madam Butterfly) - Director. 
 1956 The Story of a Fur Coat - Screenwriter.
 1957 Half Way Down (aka Haleway Down, Halfway Down) - Screenwriter.
 1957 Holiday Express - Director, screenwriter.
 1957 Mambo Girl - Director, screenwriter.
 1959 Air Hostess - Director, screenwriter.
 1959 48 Hours in Escape (aka Alias: 48 Hours Escape) - Director, screenwriter. 
 1959 Our Dream Car - Director, screenwriter.
 1960 Forever Yours - Director, screenwriter.
 1960 Happily Ever After - Director, screenwriter.
 1960 Bachelors Beware - Director, screenwriter.
 1961 Sun, Moon and Star - Director.
 1962 It's Always Spring - Director.
 1963 Because of Her - Director, screenwriter.
 1970 The Magnificent Gunfighter (aka Magnificent Gunfighters, Gallant Gunfighter) - Director.

Personal life 
Yang was a smoker. In 1978, Yang died from respiratory disease.

References

External links
 
 
 Evan Yang at dianying.com
 Evan Yang at filmaffinity.com
 Evan Yang at HKcinemamagic.com
 Yi Wen at mubi.com

1920 births
1978 deaths
Hong Kong film directors
Film directors from Beijing
Chinese emigrants to British Hong Kong